Escalonilla is a municipality located in the province of Toledo, Castile-La Mancha, Spain. According to the 2006 census (INE), the municipality has a population of 1505 inhabitants.

References

Municipalities in the Province of Toledo